Barrage may refer to:

Entertainment 
 Barrage (Barrage album), by band Barrage
 Barrage (Paul Bley album), 1965
 Barrage (group), a Canadian violin ensemble
 Barrage (film), a 2017 film
 Barrage (manga), a 2012 shōnen manga by Kōhei Horikoshi
 Barrage, a fictional character from DC Comics

Other uses
 Barrage (artillery), a line or barrier of artillery or depth charge fire
 Barrage (dam), a type of dam
 Barrage balloon, a tethered balloon used as an obstacle to attacking aircraft
 Tidal barrage, an artificial obstruction at the mouth of a tidal watercourse